Valda is a genus of ant-loving beetles in the family Staphylinidae. There is at least one described species in Valda, V. frontalis.

References

Further reading

 
 

Pselaphinae
Articles created by Qbugbot